Kamar ( Qamar) is a village in Sughd Region, northern Tajikistan. It is part of the jamoat Sarazm in the city of Panjakent.

References

Populated places in Sughd Region